Karlene Vivienne Haughton (born 18 October 1972 in Bethany, Saint Ann, Jamaica) is a Canadian retired athlete specialising in the 400 metres hurdles. She changed allegiance from her native Jamaica in 1998.

Her personal best in the event is 55.11 set in 1997.

Competition record

References

External links
 
 
 
 
 
 

1972 births
Living people
People from Saint Ann Parish
Commonwealth Games competitors for Jamaica
Jamaican female hurdlers
Canadian female hurdlers
Athletes (track and field) at the 2000 Summer Olympics
Olympic track and field athletes of Canada
Athletes (track and field) at the 1994 Commonwealth Games
Athletes (track and field) at the 1998 Commonwealth Games
Athletes (track and field) at the 2002 Commonwealth Games
Athletes (track and field) at the 1999 Pan American Games
Commonwealth Games medallists in athletics
Commonwealth Games bronze medallists for Canada
Pan American Games track and field athletes for Canada
Black Canadian female track and field athletes
Jamaican emigrants to Canada
World Athletics Championships athletes for Jamaica
World Athletics Championships athletes for Canada
Medallists at the 1998 Commonwealth Games
Medallists at the 2002 Commonwealth Games